Waimata is a rural valley in the Gisborne District of New Zealand's North Island.

The Rhythm and Vines music festival is located in the valley.

History

English immigrant and former police officer Lee Askew started beef farming in the area in 2015. She claimed to have been inspired to move there by watching British sitcom The Good Life while growing up in Devon.

A mud volcano erupted in the valley in December 2018. A month later, it had covered about 1.2 hectares in white mud and saline water.

The volcanic activity in the valley is believed to be due to movement between the Australian tectonic plate and the Pacific tectonic plate.

Parks

Gray's Bush Scenic Reserve is a conservation reserve owned and operated by Department of Conservation, which includes walkway tracks.

References

Populated places in the Gisborne District